YXU or yxu may refer to:

 YXU, the IATA code for London International Airport, Ontario, Canada
 yxu, the ISO 639-3 code for Yuyu language, South Australia